Xinan or Xin'an may refer to the following locations in China:

Xinan
Xinan, Shantou (溪南镇), town in Chenghai District, Shantou, Guangdong
Xinan, Shanwei (西南镇), Guangdong
Xinan, Xiapu County (溪南镇), Fujian
Xinan, Zhangping (溪南镇), town in Fujian
Xinan, Sichuan (西南镇), town in Mianzhuzinan

Xinan Subdistrict, Foshan (西南街道), in Sanshui District, Foshan, Guangdong
Xinan Subdistrict, Jiexiu (西南街道), Shanxi
Xinan Subdistrict, Jinzhong (西南街道), in Yuci District, Jinzhong, Shanxi

Xin'an
The following entries are written as "新安", unless otherwise noted:

Xin'an County, Henan
Bao'an County, formerly Xin'an County, historical region of Guangdong
Xin'an Station, station on Shenzhen Metro

Subdistricts
Xin'an Subdistrict, Shenzhen, in Bao'an District
Xin'an Subdistrict, Mudanjiang, in Dong'an District, Mudanjiang, Heilongjiang
Xin'an Subdistrict, Qitaihe, in Xinxing District, Qitaihe, Heilongjiang
Xin'an Subdistrict, Shuangyashan, in Baoshan District, Shuangyashan, Heilongjiang
Xin'an Subdistrict, Wuxi, in Binhu District, Wuxi, Jiangsu
Xin'an Subdistrict, Huichun, Jilin
Xin'an Subdistrict, Jilin City, in Longtan District, Jilin City
Xin'an Subdistrict, Anqiu, Shandong
Xin'an Subdistrict, Qingdao (辛安街道), in Huangdao District
Xin'an Subdistrict, Quzhou (信安街道), in Kecheng District, Quzhou, Zhejiang

Towns 
Xin'an, Lai'an County, Anhui
Xin'an, Lu'an, in Yu'an District, Lu'an, Anhui
Xin'an, Maoming, in Huazhou, Guangdong
Xin'an, Guangxi, in Pingguo County
Xin'an, Guizhou, in Anlong County
Xin'an, Langfang (信安镇), in Bazhou City
Xin'an, Zhengding County, Hebei
Xin'an, Wuyang County (辛安镇), Henan
 Xin'an, Linli (新安镇), is a town in Linli County, Hunan Province.
Xin'an, Guannan County, Jiangsu
Xin'an, Xuzhou, in Xinyi, Jiangsu
Xin'an, Changling County, Jilin
Xin'an, Inner Mongolia, in Urad Front Banner
Xin'an, Haiyang (辛安镇), Shandong
Xin'an, Jiangyou, Sichuan
Xin'an, Yibin, in Pingshan County, Sichuan
Xin'an, Tianjin, in Baodi District
Xin'an, Zhejiang, in Deqing County

Townships
Xin'an Township, Anhui, in Qimen County
Xin'an Township, Jilin, in Shulan
Xin'an Township, Yunnan, in Mojiang Hani Autonomous County